Steven Michael Colloton (born January 9, 1963) is a United States circuit judge of the United States Court of Appeals for the Eighth Circuit since 2003.

Family 
Colloton was born in Iowa City, Iowa. He is the son of John W. Colloton, best known for his service as director and CEO for the University of Iowa Hospitals and Clinics from 1971 to 1993. Colloton is also the brother of Ann Colloton. Steven attended Iowa City West High School.

Education 
Colloton earned a Bachelor of Arts degree, summa cum laude and Phi Beta Kappa, from Princeton University in 1985 and a Juris Doctor from Yale Law School in 1988. At Princeton, Colloton was a member of the Ivy Club, then an all-male eating club. While at Yale, Colloton won the Potter Stewart Prize in moot court. He was also an articles editor of the Yale Law Journal. He published a note defending single-sex student organizations, and in particular Princeton eating clubs like the Ivy Club, in the Yale Law & Policy Review. Over the summers at Yale, he worked at Bell, Boyd, & Lloyd, now part of K&L Gates, in Chicago, at Covington & Burling in Washington, D.C., and for Judge Edward R. Becker.

Professional career 
Colloton was Law clerk for Judge Laurence Silberman of the United States Court of Appeals for the District of Columbia Circuit from 1988 to 1989 and for Chief Justice William Rehnquist of the United States Supreme Court from 1989 to 1990.

Colloton served as a special assistant to the attorney general in the Office of Legal Counsel within the United States Justice Department from 1990 to 1991. He was an Assistant United States Attorney in the Northern District of Iowa in Cedar Rapids from 1991 to 1999. From 1995 to 1996 he was an associate independent counsel in the Office of Independent Counsel Kenneth Starr. He was a partner at Belin McCormick, a law firm in Des Moines, from 1999 to 2001 and served as an adjunct lecturer at the University of Iowa College of Law in 2000. In 2000, Colloton worked for George W. Bush's presidential campaign in Iowa. After Bush's election in 2000, Colloton was appointed United States Attorney for the Southern District of Iowa and served until 2003.

Federal judicial service 
Colloton was nominated to the United States Court of Appeals for the Eighth Circuit by President George W. Bush on February 12, 2003, to a seat vacated by David R. Hansen. His nomination was supported by both Chuck Grassley and Tom Harkin. He was confirmed nearly seven months later by the Senate on September 4, 2003 by a 94–1 vote. He received his commission on September 10, 2003. He was on President Donald Trump's list of potential Supreme Court candidates. Colloton's former clerks include Trevor N. McFadden, Aileen Cannon, and Marc Krickbaum.

In February 2017, Colloton vacated the enhanced sentences imposed upon members of the Native Mob, finding that Minnesota's definition of burglary was not a violent felony under the Armed Career Criminal Act.

See also 
 List of law clerks of the Supreme Court of the United States (Chief Justice)
 Donald Trump Supreme Court candidates

References

External links 
 

|-

1963 births
Living people
20th-century American lawyers
21st-century American lawyers
21st-century American judges
Assistant United States Attorneys
Federalist Society members
George W. Bush administration personnel
Judges of the United States Court of Appeals for the Eighth Circuit
Law clerks of the Supreme Court of the United States
People from Iowa City, Iowa
Princeton University alumni
United States Attorneys for the Southern District of Iowa
United States court of appeals judges appointed by George W. Bush
United States Department of Justice lawyers
University of Iowa College of Law faculty
Yale Law School alumni